Eduardo Nazareth Sánchez (born February 16, 1989) is a Venezuelan former professional baseball pitcher. He was signed by the St. Louis Cardinals as a non-drafted free agent on December 26, 2005 and played for the Cardinals and Chicago Cubs in Major League Baseball (MLB).

Sánchez throws a fastball/slider combination that can go as fast as 94-mph to 97-mph.

Professional career

St. Louis Cardinals
He earned his first win on July 29 against the VSL Tigers/Marlins, allowing one run on five hits and a walk with three strikeouts in five innings pitched. Sánchez finished the season with a record of 1-2 with 38 strikeouts and an 8.71 ERA in 19 games, two starts.

In  Sánchez split the season between the Rookie-Level GCL Cardinals and Johnson City Cardinals. He held opponents scoreless in six of his seven outings with GCL Cardinals and notched his first career save on June 21 against the GCL Marlins. He was promoted to Johnson City of the Appalachian League on July 20 and earned a save in his first appearance. Sánchez picked up his first win of the season after striking out both batters he faced on August 2. He finished the season a combined 2-2 with 29 strikeouts and a 1.27 ERA in 21 innings pitched.

He held Midwest League hitters to just a .209 average.

In  Sánchez split the season between the Class-A Advanced Palm Beach Cardinals and the Double-A Springfield Cardinals. He began the season with Palm Beach where he went 0-1 with 26 strikeouts and a 1.44 ERA in 19 games. He was promoted to Springfield and went 2-0 with 56 strikeouts, 10 saves and a 2.70 ERA. Sánchez went a combined 2-1 with 82 strikeouts, 13 saves with a 2.28 ERA in 75 innings pitched. At the end of the season Sánchez was named the Cardinals' Minor League Reliever of the Year by Scout.com. He was also named a "Top Prospect" in the Cardinals' organization by MLB.com.

He made his major league debut against the Arizona Diamondbacks at Chase Field in the 8th-9th innings on April 13, 2011, getting a groundout and two strikeouts in the 8th, giving up a double, but striking out the side in the 9th for five strikeouts in a mop-up role in the 15-5 victory.

On April 27, 2011 he got his first career save at Minute Maid Park against the Houston Astros. He gave up two earned runs but ended up completing the save striking out two in one inning of work.

In the beginning of 2013 Season, Sánchez was optioned to the Triple-A Memphis Redbirds.

Chicago Cubs
Sánchez was claimed off waivers by the Chicago Cubs. The Cubs designated him for assignment on September 1, 2013 and he later became a free agent.

References

External links

 and Minor League Baseball.

1989 births
Living people
Bravos de Margarita players
Chicago Cubs players
Gulf Coast Cardinals players
Iowa Cubs players
Johnson City Cardinals players
Lakeland Flying Tigers players
Major League Baseball pitchers
Major League Baseball players from Venezuela
Memphis Redbirds players
Mexican League baseball pitchers
Palm Beach Cardinals players
Quad Cities River Bandits players
Springfield Cardinals players
St. Louis Cardinals players
Tigres de Aragua players
Venezuelan expatriate baseball players in Mexico
Venezuelan expatriate baseball players in the United States
Venezuelan Summer League Cardinals players
Vaqueros Laguna players
Venezuelan expatriate baseball players in Italy
Sportspeople from Maracay